Nell Island (Marshallese:) is part of Kwajalein Atoll in the Ralik Chain in the Republic of the Marshall Islands (RMI), 2,100 nautical miles (3900 km) southwest of Honolulu, Hawaii. It lies at a convergence of deep, narrow, protected channels and small islands. This area was the traditional seat of power for the Iroij (High Chiefs) at Kwajalein, prior to foreign occupation and population displacement.

Nel(Nōl) is part of a group of four islands – including Enmaat, Pikon-Nōl and Anē-Ruo – with special historical importance in Marshallese culture.  Marshallese consider these islands some of the most sacred or "mo" (tabu) islands in Kwajalein Atoll.  Enmaat was the residence of the high chiefs' families.  Traditional Marshallese cultural leadership  and land-ownership for these islands resides with the Kabua family.  According to Ato Langio, a Marshallese elder, the area just inside Enmaat – protected by Enmaat, Anē-ruo, Nōl and Pikon-Nōl – is one of the most protected canoe anchorages in the atoll. Early Marshallese cultures relied heavily on their expert navigation skills, their skill in building and sailing the large (up to 100') ocean-going outrigger canoes  known as Proa and on the unique Marshall Islands stick chart as a means of navigational documentation.  The Nel area was called "mien wa" (sheltered haven for canoes for the chief), and protected by "Limejwa", a Marshallese idol. With wistful sadness modern day Marshallese relate how children could cross the channel with immunity protected by "Limejwa" using coconuts for flotation. Pacific cultures anthropologist Dr. Larry Carucci  did extensive research on the cultural significance of sites in Kwajalein Atoll.  He explains that the Nel area is especially significant because the Iroij and Leiroj lived there and also because the island of Anē-ruo was "uliej", the graveyard or cemetery of high chiefs. To this day, out of respect and a sense of "mo" many Marshallese transiting the area stop across the channel from Nōl – on Enmaat – and do not make landfall on Nōl.

These islands fall within the "mid-atoll corridor" which was evacuated in 1965 to establish a safe area for ICBM testing (NIke X program) when Kwajalein Atoll was part of the United Nations Trust Territories.  The residents were moved to Ebeye where they remain up to this day under terms of a Compact of Free Association.

There's confusion within the non-native population at Kwajalein regarding just which island here is Nel. Many refer to the group of four islands – Nel, Enmaat, Pikon-Nōl, Ane-ruo – as Nel. Nel Island is the larger, longer island east of the chiefs' island and Nel Pass, but recent residents of the Atoll have come to refer to the smaller Anē-Ruo(Enero) island as Nel. This small (1/8 x 1/4 mi) island – the "king's island" – lies lagoon-side of Enmaat and west of Nel Pass. This is the "Nell" that is destination for many current visitors to the area while Nel itself is the much larger (1/8 x 3.5 mi) island east of Nel pass.

References

Kwajalein Atoll
Islands of the Marshall Islands